Sinocyclocheilus flexuosdorsalis is a species of ray-finned fish in the genus Sinocyclocheilus.

References 

flexuosdorsalis
Fish described in 2012